Chevy Plaza and Chevy Chase Center was a proposed two-building, nine-story residential and commercial development in Lexington, Kentucky. It would have been located at East High Street and Euclid Avenue and at East High Street and South Ashland Avenue.

The $25 million project, first proposed on March 19, 1984, would require the reconstruction of nearly two city blocks in the Chevy Chase district of the city, involving 12 separate properties. The development company, Progressive Companies, owned numerous properties in the district. The first nine-story structure, titled Chevy Plaza, would have included two or three floors of retail shops with residential condominiums for the remainder. It would have been located at the southwest corner of East High Street and Euclid Avenue where WDKY-TV now resides; at the time it was a KFC fast-food restaurant. The second tower would be called Chevy Chase Plaza and would have been located at the southwest corner of East High Street and South Ashland Avenue. It would feature retail shops on the ground floor and eight floors of residential condominiums. Both structures would have included a parking garage.

It would be constructed in three phases, with construction beginning in late 1984 with the completion date coming in 1986. The development was unique in that it would require no public dollars or bond issues, however, it would require a zoning change for the location.

The surrounding properties would have featured numerous streetscape enhancements, such as the inclusion of gaslights, new trees, canopies, and a fountain at Chevy Plaza.

See also
 Cityscape of Lexington, Kentucky

References

Commercial buildings in Lexington, Kentucky
Office buildings in Lexington, Kentucky